The 'Lincoln Zephyr V12 was a 75° V12 engine introduced by Ford Motor Company's Lincoln division for the Lincoln-Zephyr in 1932.

Lincoln produced two other L-head V12s in 1932, but required a more compact unit for their new streamlined Lincoln-Zephyr line. As Ford had just introduced their Flathead V8, this was the logical starting point for a new Lincoln V12. The Lincoln-Zephyr V12 would quickly replace the previous-generation V12, just as the Lincoln-Zephyr car replaced the rest of the Lincoln line, and would be the company's primary engine through 1948.

Overview
Similar in design to the 90° Ford flathead V8 introduced for 1932, the Lincoln-Zephyr H Series V-12 had a narrower 75° between cylinder banks. The engine used aluminum-alloy heads and cast-steel pistons, as well as two water pumps.  It also had a unique distributor with a coil assembly that actually consisted of two coils, one for each cylinder bank.

Initial power output was quoted as 110 horsepower -- a little higher than the target figure -- at 3,900 rpm, a rather high power peak for those days. The torque curve was quite flat, however, with at least 180 pounds/feet available from 3,500 rpm all the way down to 400 rpm, which made for incredible top-gear performance. Though the Zephyr V-12 no more resembled previous Lincoln engines than the ubiquitous V-8 (despite sharing the latter's stroke), it was more like a "12-cylinder Ford" than a classic multi-cylinder powerplant in character. And it was not without problems. The main ones were inadequate crankcase ventilation that caused rapid sludge buildup in sustained low-rpm running, aggravated by poor oil flow, plus too-small water passages that led to overheating, bore warpage, and ring wear. To a degree, some of these maladies were dealt with during the Zephyr's first year, and Ford improved the engine by adopting hydraulic valve lifters for 1938 and cast-iron heads and oiling improvements for 1942. Yet this V-12 never shed its reputation for service troubles, though the postwar versions were actually quite reliable.

The V12 was eventually replaced by the InVincible 8, simply a version of the flathead V8 found on Ford's truck line.

The Zephyr V12 was also used by Allard, Atalanta, and Brough Superior in England.  Allard made three V12 cars, using the Ford V8 for all other cars at that time, Brough also made only one V12 as his others were Hudson 6 or 8 powered, and Jensen made one called the HL.

267
The first Lincoln-Zephyr models of 1936 used a  engine which produced . This engine was upgraded with hydraulic lifters in 1938 and produced for one further year.

292

This engine was reused from late 1946 through 1948 and was the last of the line produced.

306
A single month of 1942 production used a  version of the engine. The reason for the reversion to the smaller size was that the cylinder walls on the bored-out engine were found to be too thin. Many disappeared altogether in the block casting process at the factory causing many blocks to be scrapped before installation. Cylinder wear in the field was extreme, and re-boring during engine overhaul was impossible.

Notes

References

See also
List of Ford engines

Zephyr
V12 engines